SL2 may refer to:

Art and entertainment 
 SL2 (musical group), British breakbeat hardcore group
 Stuart Little 2, a 2022 film

Maths and science 
 Special linear Lie algebra 
 the mathematical structure SL2(F), a special linear group
 SL2 RNA, a non-coding RNA involved in trans splicing in lower eukaryotes
 Skylab 2 (SL-2), a NASA space mission

Technology and transport 
 Leicaflex SL2, a mechanical reflex camera
 Canon EOS 200D, or Rebel SL2, a digital reflex camera
 Schütte-Lanz SL2, an airship used in WWI
 SL2, car in the Saturn S series
 SL2 (MBTA bus), Boston bus line
 Skylab 2 (SL-2), a NASA space mission

Other uses 
 SL postcode area, the Slough postal region covering Farnham, Great Britain
 Situational Leadership II, a leadership theory developed by Paul Hersey
 Super League Greece 2 Greece's 2nd Division football championship